Annie Cleland Millar (15 March 1855 – 25 March 1939) was a New Zealand businesswoman. She was born on 15 March 1855. In 2015, she was posthumously inducted into the New Zealand Business Hall of Fame.

References

1855 births
1939 deaths
New Zealand women in business